Partch is a surname. Notable people with the surname include:

Harry Partch (1901–1974), American composer, music theorist, and creator of musical instruments, uncle of Virgil Partch
Virgil Partch (1916–1984), American cartoonist

See also
Patch (disambiguation)#People
Pertsch